NGC 108 is a barred lenticular galaxy that is located at approximately 220 million light-years away in the constellation of  Andromeda. It was discovered by William Herschel on September 11, 1784.

References

External links
 

0108
001619
Andromeda (constellation)
17840911
Discoveries by William Herschel
Barred lenticular galaxies
Ring galaxies